Ystrad Mynach is a town in the Caerphilly County Borough, within the ancient county of Glamorgan, Wales, and is  north of the town of Caerphilly. The urban area has a population of 19,204, and stands in the Rhymney Valley. Before the Industrial Revolution and the coming of coal mining in the South Wales Coalfield the valley was rural and farmed. It lies in the community of Gelligaer.

Etymology 
In the Welsh language,  is a wide flat bottomed valley and  means "monk". As there is a lack of evidence for monks settling in the area, the word may have been the name of a tributary of the Rhymney River.

It has been suggested that, rather than referring to a monastic institution,  is  "place" + , a suffix associated with the names of marshy floodplains, also found in nearby Llanbradach and Llancaiach. Prior to erection of defences on the River Rhymney in the 1960s the town was indeed subject to periodic flooding.

Amenities and history 
The town houses a number of council offices, as well as the Ystrad Mynach campus of Coleg y Cymoedd, a further education college established in 1959 to provide training for local coal miners and merged with neighbouring Coleg Morgannwg to form Coleg y Cymoedd in 2013.

The nearby Penallta Colliery was the last coal mine to close in the valley. Other notable buildings and structures are the Ystrad Mynach railway station, opened in 1890, the viaduct, a sculpture to commemorate the areas industrial heritage, a community hospital, a number of schools, and the Beech Tree, Coopers Arms and Royal Oak pubs.

From 1927 to 1996, Ystrad Mynach hosted the 'F' division headquarters of Glamorgan Constabulary (from 1968, South Wales Police).

Ystrad Mynach railway station was a location for one of Ronnie Barker's Porridge episodes. Records show that Ystrad Mynach railway station was in existence in 1857, when it was known as Ystrad Junction.

A new Local General Hospital Ysbyty Ystrad Fawr was opened in late 2011. Work started on the Ystrad Fawr site in September 2007. It is located between the A469 Caerphilly to Newbridge Road and the old Caerphilly Road between Ystrad Mynach and Llanbradach. This replaced the services provided by the previous Ystrad Mynach Hospital.

Situated to the north of Ystrad Mynach, is a collection of houses called Tredomen; these houses were built to house the workers of the since-demolished Tredomen Works. They are socially graded houses – ranging from two-up two-down, to a five-bedroom manor in Park Lane with adjoining servants' quarters.

In February 2018, the Beech Tree Fish Bar was severely damaged in a car crash, and the incident made national news. No-one was killed, but three people were taken to hospital.

Religion 

The Anglican parish church for Ystrad Mynach and Llanbradach is Holy Trinity. It is a Grade II listed building, built in 1855–1857, by architect John Norton, for Revd George Thomas whose family were locally important landowners from Llanbradach.

Bryn Seion Welsh Church is a nondenominational Christian church dedicated to continuing worship, fellowship and singing in the Welsh tradition. Situated on Lisburn Road, it was built as a Baptist chapel during the mid-nineteenth century, in the Round-Headed style of the long-wall entry type. It bears a mosaic, approximately  square, with the name of the chapel, the chapel logo, the year 1906 and geometric shapes, including circles.

The Methodist Church, on Lewis Street, was extended in 2013 to provide additional space for both worship and community groups. It also has an enclosed grassed area. The Siloh Calvinistic Methodist chapel was opened on 10 May 1910, when the town itself was growing quickly following the sinking of Penallta colliery in 1905–1910.

Bethany United Reformed Church is located on Lisburn Road.

Governance
There are two tiers of local government covering Ystrad Mynach, at community and county borough level: Gelligaer Community Council and Caerphilly County Borough Council. Caerphilly County Borough Council has its main offices at Penallta House in the Tredomen area of Ystrad Mynach.

Ystrad Mynach historically straddled the ancient parishes of Gelligaer and Llanfabon, both of which were in the county of Glamorgan. Much of the boundary between the two parishes was the stream called Nant Caiach (roughly following Nelson Road, the A472), with Gelligaer to the north and Llanfabon to the south. Holy Trinity Church was built in 1855–1856 as a chapel of ease within the parish of Llanfabon. In 1890 Holy Trinity was made the parish church for a new ecclesiastical parish of Ystrad Mynach, covering parts of the civil parishes of Llanfabon and Gelligaer.

For civil purposes, Ystrad Mynach continued to straddle Gelligaer and Llanfabon. Llanfabon was administered as part of Caerphilly from 1893, whilst Gelligaer became an urban district in 1908. Caerphilly Urban District and Gelligaer Urban District were abolished in 1974, with both areas becoming part of Rhymney Valley District, being the first time that a district-level authority had covered all of Ystrad Mynach. Communities were established to replace the old parishes at the same time, with the communities initially using the boundaries of the abolished urban districts, and so Ystrad Mynach straddled the communities of Gelligaer and Caerphilly. The community boundaries were amended in 1985 to put Ystrad Mynach entirely within the community of Gelligaer.

The Office for National Statistics defines Ystrad Mynach as a built-up area sub-division within the wider Newport built-up area. The Ystrad Mynach sub-division covers Ystrad Mynach itself and Gelligaer, Hengoed, Maesycwmmer, and Penpedairheol, and had a population of 19,204 at the 2011 census. For postal purposes, Ystrad Mynach is not considered a post town, but instead comes under the Hengoed post town, CF82. Gelligaer Community Council calls Ystrad Mynach a town, whereas all the other places it covers (including Hengoed) it calls villages.

Sport

2020 Olympic Games - Tokyo

On 8 August 2021, Lauren Price won Team GB's 22nd and final gold medal of the 2020 Olympic Games, defeating China's Li Qian in the Middleweight Boxing final.

Lauren, inspired by her grandparents Linda and the late Derek Price, who raised her, previously played international football for Wales and had won the Kickboxing World Championship. Lauren completed an unprecedented trio of achievements across three different sports with a flawless performance for Team GB. The young boxer's Tokyo performances captured the imagination of her community back home in South Wales with her energy, ring speed and competitive brilliance.

Lauren described her gold medal as a ‘dream come true’ and dedicated it to her Nan and Gramp in an emotional post-podium interview, saying she couldn't wait to get home to see her Nan and ‘it looks like we’re getting a gold post-box in Ystrad Mynach, outside my house’.

Penallta Rugby Football Club
Penallta RFC is a rugby union club is based in Ystrad Mynach. The Rugby Club was inaugurated by a group of miners from Penallta colliery in 1952.

It is an affiliated member of the Welsh Rugby Union and plays in the Welsh National League.

Since 2000, Penallta RFC has been one of the most successful rugby clubs in Wales, winning numerous titles at all levels. Penallta won the Worthington Welsh District's Cup at the Millennium Stadium in 2001, the Swalec Plate at the Millennium Stadium in 2012 and the National Plate at the Principality Stadium in 2017. They finished runner's up in the Plate competition in 2016, meaning the village club played in a youth or senior final at the National Stadium a remarkable five times in six seasons.

Amid a string of league titles, including winning Division 1 East in 2015, Penallta has won two Silver Ball titles, in 2005 and 2015. Penallta Youth has also been extraordinarily successful. The youth team played at the Millennium Stadium in 2014 and 2015, winning the coveted Welsh Youth Cup and then finishing runners-up a year later. In 2014 the Penallta Youth side, led by Scarlets player Jack Condy, won all eight competitions they entered, winning every single game.

UCY - Union Cycliste Ystrad Mynach
UCY - Union Cycliste Ystrad Mynach was founded in May 2013 by Arwel James and Gethin Smallwood. The club caters for male and female cyclists from teenage upwards. As of October 2020, the club has around 100 members.

Weekly club runs range from 30 to 80 miles. Weekly rides include the Sunday club run, commencing at 9 am, Saturday, 9 am for the popular leisurely "Breakfast Club" ride, and during the Summer months, the club hosts evening rides (mainly Tuesday & Thursday). All club rides leave from the Centre For Sporting Excellence.

It is a social cycling club which focuses on local sportives and charity cycling events.

The club has affiliation to Welsh Cycling and British Cycling and regularly receives Sports Wales funding for training equipment and venue hire to encourage off season fitness. Qualified coaches support development and rider safety.

Centre for Sporting Excellence

The CCB Centre for Sporting Excellence was erected on Caerphilly Road in May 2014. The centre has taken its place on the land of the old Ystrad Mynach Hospital and was built in conjunction with many partners, including Heron Bros Ltd Of Northern Ireland, at a cost of around £6 million. The facility is run by Caerphilly County Borough Council and it is hoped the local community will use the centre to create a thriving sporting culture within the region.

Valley Greyhound Stadium
The Valley Greyhound Stadium is a greyhound racing stadium in Twyn Road sandwiched between the Caerphilly Road and A469 and on the east bank of the Rhymney River (on the north side of the Dyffryn Business Park). It opened in 1976.

New Cottage Dance Centre
The New Cottage Dance Centre is on The Bridge in Ystrad Mynach and is home to dance teams. The dance centre has six registered teachers on the IDTA website.

The 'Ystrad Fawr' formation teams have been successful in the British Championships. Their teams being former British Champions.

In 2016, the 'Ystrad Fawr Dancers' entered the talent contest, Britain's Got Talent and made it through the heats. On 21 May, it was then announced that the team got through to the semi-finals. They competed in the semi-final (23 May) and finished ninth place.

Notable natives / residents 
Paul Atherton, film producer/director
Richard Brake, actor
Mervyn Burtch, composer 
Andy Fairweather Low, guitarist 
Morgan Lindsay, (1857–1935), British Army officer and racehorse trainer
Lauren Price,  Olympic Gold Medal winner
Greville Wynne, spy

See also
2353 (Ystrad Mynach) Squadron ATC

References

External links

Ystrad Mynach College
Welsh Coal Mines - check out the local pit history
A photo of Ystrad Mynach in 1938
Union Cycliste Ystrad Mynach

Towns in Caerphilly County Borough